My Dear Girl, Jin-young (also known as I Love You, Jin-young!) is a 2013 South Korean drama film starring Kim Gyu-ri and Park Won-sang. Directed by Lee Sung-eun in his first feature film, it revolves around a failing screenwriter whose life is in a mess.

Plot
Kim Jin-young (Kim Gyu-ri) is an aspiring screenwriter but is unable to sell her scripts as she is obsessed and writes only about zombies. Although in her thirties, she was never in a relationship.

One day, she meets her senior alumnus Hwang Tae-il (Park Won-sang) who finds her script interesting and decides to make it into a film. Since then, her life starts to change.

Cast
 Kim Gyu-ri as Kim Jin-young
 Park Won-sang as Hwang Tae-il
 Yoon So-jeong as Park Chul-soon 
 Choi Yu-hwa as Kim Ja-young
 Jung In-seo as In-seo
 Jeon Soo-jin as Jamie
 Im Won-hee as gynecologist (cameo)

Reception
Korean Cinema Today: The film positively portrays the work and love of women and their thoughts on their families through their everyday lives.

Hancinema: Netizens claim it's a healing movie which connects with female viewers.

References

External links 
 
 
 

2013 films
2010s Korean-language films
South Korean drama films
2010s South Korean films